Saint Peter's and Saint John's Anglican Church is an historic building in Baddeck, Nova Scotia. The church is one of only four remaining churches designed by Reverend Simon Gibbons, Canada's first Inuit priest. Built in 1883, the church is the second of six churches built by Gibbons in Nova Scotia.

It is believed that Gibbons first came into contact with the Cambridge Camden Society while building Saint Peter's and Saint John's Anglican Church.  St. Peter's and St. John's was designated a Provincially Registered Property under the Heritage Property Act in 1990 due to its connection to Gibbons and because it best exemplifies the style of the Cambridge Camden society  which advocated a return to simple Medieval styles.  Typical of neo-Gothic architecture, the wooden church features buttresses, pointed arch windows, and a round-headed window on the east elevation.

The church continues to hold masses to this day.

See also
Historic Buildings in Baddeck, Nova Scotia
History of Baddeck

References

Churches completed in 1883
Heritage sites in Nova Scotia
Buildings and structures in Victoria County, Nova Scotia
Anglican church buildings in Nova Scotia
19th-century Anglican church buildings in Canada
1883 establishments in Nova Scotia